John Wilson Burrough (17 June 1904 – 11 September 1969) was an English first-class cricketer who played in 10 matches for Oxford University and Gloucestershire between 1924 and 1937. He was born in Summertown, Oxford and died at Seale, Surrey.

References

1904 births
1969 deaths
English cricketers
Oxford University cricketers
Gloucestershire cricketers
Alumni of St John's College, Oxford